Pady is a rural locality (a selo) in Progressovskoye Rural Settlement, Paninsky District, Voronezh Oblast, Russia. The population was 224 as of 2010. There are 6 streets.

Geography 
Pady is located on the Bityug River, 29 km east of Panino (the district's administrative centre) by road. Borshchyovo is the nearest rural locality.

References 

Rural localities in Paninsky District